Pseudochromis caudalis, the stripe-tailed dottyback, is a species of ray-finned fish from the Indian Ocean from Sri Lanka and southern India to the waters of the Gulf of Oman and the Strait of Hormuz., which is a member of the family Pseudochromidae.

References

caudalis
Taxa named by George Albert Boulenger
Fish described in 1898